Lamprochernes is a genus of pseudoscorpions in the family Chernetidae.

Species
Lamprochernes contains the following species
 Lamprochernes chyzeri – Chyzer's shining claw
 Lamprochernes foxi
 Lamprochernes indicus
 Lamprochernes leptaleus
 Lamprochernes minor
 Lamprochernes moreoticus
 Lamprochernes muscivorus
 Lamprochernes nodosus
 Lamprochernes procer
 Lamprochernes savignyi

References

Chernetidae
Pseudoscorpion genera